Iliyas Daudi (born January 29, 1967) is a former Soviet and Russian military serviceman, best known for being one of few veterans of the Soviet–Afghan War who was awarded the title Hero of Russian Federation.

Early and family life
Iliyas Daudi was born in Aznakayevo, Russian SFSR, Soviet Union. In 1984 he graduated from a secondary school No.2 and after that became a champion of local and federal boxing tournaments who won a title of Candidate for Master of Sport of the USSR.
— Both of Iliyas Daudi's grandfathers — Misbakhetdin Safin and Akhmadullah Idrisov fought in the Second World War against Nazi Germany. During a breakthrough from the encirclement near Bryansk in 1942, grandfather Akhmadulla was seriously wounded by an artillery shell, his thigh was amputated. Exactly the same injury, 44 years later, in August 1986, in Afghanistan, his grandson, a military intelligence sergeant, Iliyas Daudi, who was blown up by an Italian anti-personnel mine.
— After returning from the war and treatment in hospitals, in the same year he continued his studies at the Faculty of Economics Gubkin Russian State University of Oil and Gas, from where 2 years ago, as a student at a prestigious university, at his own request, he asked for the Soviet–Afghan War.
— The father of a large family, in one marriage brings up 6 children: a son and five daughters. The son Dauddin, following the example of his father, served in the 45th Guards Spetsnaz Brigade, became a military intelligence officer, a reserve lieutenant. Developer of innovative projects in the field of regenerative medicine.

Military service
In August 1985, after basic military training Daudi was assigned to military reconnaissance unit of 149th Guards Motor Rifle Regiment of Limited Contingent of Soviet forces in Afghanistan (official title of 40th Army).
— His military career started from reconnaissance operations in the rank of senior scout, then he took a position of a squad-leader of surveillance section. Soviet Colonel General Alexander Skorodumov wrote in his memories that Iliyas Daudi was not only formal leader, but the informal one too. Moreover, sometimes Daudi faced accusations in not obeying the rules and even hooliganism. Surprisingly, it wasn't an obstacle for him to become a deputy of platoon commander and join a Communist Party of the Soviet Union.
— On 18 August 1986, I.Daudi participated in a large-scale Soviet operation Operation Trap on the Afghan-Iranian border in Herat province to capture the base fortified complex of the mujahideen Kokari-Sharshari of a prominent afghan warlord Ismail Khan. In battle, risking his life, he saved three comrades. A day later, 23 August in violent clashes with mujahideen, on a mission to supply his soldiers with ammunition, he stepped on an Italian antipersonnel mine. The explosion blew off his thigh and he received a severe concussion. According to the testimony of his army friends, he asked them to shoot him to get rid of the burden, but they managed to evacuate him from the combat. In November 1986, he was decommissioned from the Soviet Army after spending a lot of time in rehabilitation in hospital zone.
— Many years later his combat performance was investigated and evaluated as outstanding heroism. In December 2009 by the order of Russian President Dmitry Medvedev he was awarded with a Hero of Russian Federation.

After returning from the war
After prolonged treatment in military hospitals and prosthetics of an amputated leg, he returned to Gubkin Russian State University of Oil and Gas and four years later graduated with honors.
— In the early 1990s, he created a restaurant holding company. He directed his earned funds to help the families of the deceased veterans of the Afghan war. At the same time, he paid for prosthetics of the German company Ottobock for 82 amputee soldiers from the city of Moscow and the Moscow region who lost their arms and legs in that war.
— In 2012, graduated from Russian Presidential Academy of National Economy and Public Administration (2012). Thesis defense topic: «The national interests of the Russian Federation in the Central Asian region in the context of the military-political situation in and around Afghanistan».
— In 2022, entered the Gerasimov Institute of Cinematography (VGIK) — higher courses «directing and producing films and television», made his debut in the curriculum of the course with the short film «Self-Portrait» (2022).

Writing activity
Member of the «Writers' Union of Russia». Novelist, essayist, publicist, columnist.
The author's works are devoted to military topics with an anti-war philosophy.
— He is the author stories and essays about the events of the Afghan war (1979-1989) in the publications of the Russian Ministry of Defense — the magazine «Armeiskyi sbornik», the newspaper «Krasnaya Zvezda» and others: «Kabul Hospital», «Pilaf for Sheraghi», «He built a bridge across the Elbe», «It was impossible otherwise», «Lead blizzard», «Born in the flames of wars», «Stepped into immortality», «Twice past», «Steel stronger», «Afghanistan — a look into the past» — a trilogy, «For that guy» and others.
— Winner of the 11th All-Russian literary competition of the Central House of the Russian Army of the Ministry of Defense of Russia in 2017 in the nomination «Prose and Drama» with «Essay of a wounded soldier» from the collection «Notes of a military intelligence officer».
— Author of the military historical novel-trilogy «In the circle of Kunduz» (2020) — about the fate of six Soviet intelligence officers during the Afghan war and after it.
A number of leading Russian publications and the Russian Military Historical Society reported on nomination of Iliyas Daudi for this novel for the «Nobel Prize in Literature 2022, 2021». 
Chapters of the novel were published in Russian literary and art magazines: «Nevsky almanakh»; «Sever»; «Shores»; «Russkoe pole»; «Belaya skala»; «Biyskyi vestnik»; «Don»; «Gostiny dvor»; «Litkultprivet»; «Kazan»; «Crimea»;  «Istoki»; «Argamak»; «Novaya Nemiga».
At the presentation at the Russian military historical society on 9.12.2020, I. Daudi announced that he had written a script for a full-length feature film for his novel «In the Circle of Kunduz».
— On August 31, 2021, on the day of the withdrawal of the International Security Assistance Force (ISAF) from Afghanistan, I.Daudi's historical documentary book «The Great War in Afghanistan» was published with studies of the reasons for the entry of Soviet troops into this country in 1979 and their involvement in a long-lasting civil war.
— Later in the same year were published three novells — «We’ll all be back!», «Not the front corridor», «Zugzwang of Ober Lieutenant Bruno Thevs»
— In 2022, the anti-militaristic novel «The Zugzwang of Oberleutnant Bruno Thevs», replete with facts of resonant actions in Afghanistan International Security Assistance Force (ISAF) led by NATO in the 2000s − nominated for «The Peace Prize of German Booksellers».

References

Publications in Russian
 Iliyas Daudi. The military-historical novel-trilogy «IN THE CIRCLE OF KUNDUZ» The story of heroes among whom you want to live. Autor I.Daudi  — М.: DeLibri, 2020 394 с. Д21 УДК 82-311.6 ББК 84 (4Рос=Рус) 6-405.2020
 «The Great Game of Afghanistan» rus.«Большая игра в Афганистан»  — М.: Де’Либри, Д21 УДК  82-311.6 ББК 84 (4Рос=Рус) 6-44
 «Комбат с позывным «Кобра», с. 46-49
 «Операция «Западня», с. 88-92
 «Афганистан. Мармольские войсковые операции», с. 89-95
 «Кабульский госпиталь», с. 48-51
 «Плов для Шераги», с. 48-51
 «Он построил мост через Эльбу», с. 96-100
 «Иначе было нельзя», с. 149-152
 «Мела свинцовая метель», с. 180-185
 «Шагнувшие в бессмертие»
 «С короткой биографией, великою судьбой», с. 151-158
 «Афганистан: горное эхо Второй мировой». Часть 1
 «Афганистан: горное эхо Второй мировой». Часть 2

Heroes of the Russian Federation
Russian writers
Writers from Moscow
Russian novelists
Russian public relations people
Russian communists
Soviet military personnel of the Soviet–Afghan War
1967 births
Living people
People from Aznakayevsky District